Adolfo Dollero (November 11, 1872), son of Tancredi Dollero and Ernestina Cane, was an Italian Mexican historian who travelled and lived in many countries in Latin America. He married Maria Luisa Paoletti, countess of Rodoretto, from the region of Piemonte in Italy. He authored various books among them:
 México al día (impresiones y notas de viaje), 1911, publisher Paris/México, Librería de la Viuda de C Bouret, 972 pagine, con immagini
 Il Messico d’oggi, 1914, Milano, Ulrico Hoepli ed, 909 pagine, con 300 illustrazioni, 20 tavole e una carta itineraria
 ¿El problema social ha sido ó no el móvil de las últimas revoluciones mexicanas?, 1915, en: La Reforma Social, La Habana, Tomo IV, abril a julio de 1915, pp 412–423
 Consideraciones sobre la guerra europea, 1915, en: La Reforma Social, La Habana, Tomo V, agosto a noviembre de 1915, pp 29–47
 Cultura Cubana/Cuban Culture, 1916, Habana, Imprenta “El Siglo XX”, 478 pagine, bilingue: spagnolo e inglese, con numerose immagini
 Las simpatias de Cuba por Italia (Con motivo de la reimpresión del folleto del Dr Fernando Ortiz, “Los Mambises Italianos”), 1917, in: Revista Bimestre Cubana, Vol XII, Septiembre-Octubre 1917, Núm5, pp 327–331, e successivamente, come Proemio, in: Italia y Cuba, 1917, di Fernando Ortiz, pp 3–6
 Cultura Cubana (La provincia de Matanzas y su evolución), 1919, Habana, Imp Seoane y Fernández, 438 pagine
 Cultura Cubana Evolución de la provincia de Matanzas Suplemento, 1919, 32 pagine
 Ideas e Ideales (Revista mensual de propaganda y defensa de la causa aliada), 1919, La Habana, diretta da Adolfo Dollero; pubblicati solo 7 numeri: junio-diciembre 1919
 Cultura Cubana (La provincia de Pinar del Río y su evolución), 1921, Habana, Imp Seoane y Fernández, 436 pagine
 Cultura Cubana Evolución de la provincia de Pinar del Río Suplemento, 1921; non consultato
 Cultura Colombiana Apuntaciones sobre el movimiento intelectual de Colombia, desde la Conquista hasta la época actual, 1930, Bogotá, editorial Cromos, non consultato
 Cultura de Venezuela Apuntaciones sobre la evolución de la cultura desde la Conquista Excursiones, 1933, Caracas, Tipografía Americana, 2 Tomos; il secondo non consultato
 Cultura de Venezuela Apéndice, 1933; non consultato
 Italia y los italianos en la historia y en la cultura de Venezuela, stampatore e anno sconosciuti; non consultato
 Las glorias de Italia en la civilización del mundo, inedito (?), coautore: Manuel Dollero

Source: Domenico Capolongo, 2006, Adolfo Dollero, un intellettuale italiano tra Messico, Cuba, Colombia e Venezuela, in: Emigrazione e presenza italiana in Cuba, Vol.VI, ed. Circ. Cult. B.G. Duns Scoto di Roccarainola, pp. 179–226.

1872 births
1936 deaths
Italian emigrants to Mexico
20th-century Mexican historians